Oswaldo Calisto Rivera, also known as Cachibache (Quito, September 22, 1979 – October 10, 2000) was an Ecuadorian poet and artist who completed over 100 paintings.

Poetry
"Rojo encanto de la marmota" (2001)

References 

1979 births
2000 deaths
Ecuadorian poets
Ecuadorian artists
People from Quito
20th-century poets